Nakodaji Tirth is a major Jain  (pilgrimage site) in the Indian state of Rajasthan, located between the villages of Vikrampura and Nakoda in Barmer District.

Main temple
The temple is an important pilgrimage center visited by both Jains and Hindus. Devotees visit the shrine, especially after marriage.

History
According to Jain legend, the Nakodaji temple was initially built by Jain acharya Sthulabhadra (3rd century BCE). However, the current structure was constructed in 11th century CE. The temple has 246 inscriptions indicating multiple renovations and additions over the centuries. The temple was invaded by Alam Shah. However, the central icon of Parshavanatha, along with 120 idols, was safely hidden in a nearby village. In 1449 CE, the central image, along with an icon of Bhairava, was later re-installed in the temple by Acharya Kirtisuri. The renovation of the temple was commissioned by Kalija. An image of Acharya Kirtisuri was installed opposite the Bhairava image by Hetha Shah.

The first international seminar on the "yogic tradition of India with special reference to Jain yoga" was held at the India International Centre, and sponsored by Nakodaji Tirth and B. L. Institute of Indology.

Architecture

The temple is famous for its architecture. It is a large structure with a highly decorated façade. The principal shrine is a large domical structure, with 52 domical sub-shrines along its axis. The temple is constructed using makrana marble and Jaisalmer's sandstone. The elaborate  of the temple is regarded as a rare example of architectural and sculptural elegance. The temple has two life-sized elephant sculptures with riders on either side of its entrance. The temple also has  (underground chamber) housing 35 idols.

A  (protective shelter for stray cows) is managed by the temple.

Deities
The central icon, popularly known as Nakoda Parshvanath, is a  black stone idol of Parshvanatha. According to Jain legend, the image was discovered in Nakoda village when a Jain layman had a dream about its presence. However, the icon was not found at the indicated placethe exact location was pointed out by Bhairava in the following dream. Nakoda Parshvanath is one of the 108 Parshvanatha icons and is considered one of the most devotionally revered of Parshvanatha. The icons and the images of the deity are installed in the temple and household shrines. According to Jain belief, worshipping replications of the idol is equivalent to worshipping the original icon. A fair is organised here on the birth anniversary of Parshvanatha that draws numerous devotees.

The temple is noted for the worship of the tutelary deity Nakoda Bhairava, who is popular among devotees. Nakoda Bhairava is an important guardian deity within the Svetambara sect. Nakoda Bhairava is believed to grant the wishes of devotees that make offering there; performing  (praying) brings prosperity.. Nakoda Bhairava is also linked to tantra and is believed to free people from spirit possession. The food offering is an uncommon practice in Jainism. However, at Nakodaji,  is offered to Nakoda Bhairava. The  is required to be consumed inside the temple and should not be taken outside.

There is another sub-shrine near the main shrine housing an idol of Kal Bhairava, Nakoda Bhairava's brother.

Other temples

Besides the main temple, there are two more: Lachi Bai temple (Rishabhdev temple), and Shantinath temple as well as one  in the village.

Lachi Bai temple was constructed in 1511 CE by Chhalibai, sister of Acharya Jinchandra Suri. The temple is dedicated to Rishabhanatha.

Shantinath Jain temple, constructed in the 19th century, is a large structure with a highly decorated façade. The temple facade wall has carvings of Laskhmi and Saraswati within separate niches.

Dādābadī, built outside the main shrine, is a shrine dedicated to the four Dādā Gurus revered by the Kharatara Gaccha. The shrine also houses an idol of Kal Bhairava.

Samosaran temple, built near the main temple, is a depiction of Samavasarana (divine preaching hall of the Tirthankara).

See also
Kesariyaji
Ranakpur Jain temple
Dilwara temples

Notes

Citations

Bibliography

Book

Web

Indira Gandhi National Centre for the Arts

Government of Rajasthan

External links

Jain temples in Rajasthan
11th-century Jain temples